Pinecrest High School (PHS) is a high school located in Southern Pines, North Carolina in the United States. It is part of the Moore County School District, and was built in 1969.

Pinecrest High School is ranked 105th within North Carolina. Students have the opportunity to take Advanced Placement coursework and exams. The AP participation rate at Pinecrest High School is 40%. The total minority enrollment is 38%, and 24% of students are economically disadvantaged. Pinecrest High School is 1 of 3 high schools in Moore County Schools.

Pinecrest offered an IB Diploma track until 2009, when the program was cancelled due to budgetary concerns and lack of student interest. On March 14, 2020, North Carolina Governor Roy Cooper closed all schools March 16 through May 16 due to the COVID-19 Coronavirus Pandemic.  On April 25, Governor Roy Cooper closed all schools for the rest of the school year. In June 2020, Cooper announced a plan for all students to go back to school, some on Monday and Tuesday and others Thursday and Friday while Wednesday is used to sanitize. On March 12, 2021, Moore County Schools announced five day a week classes would resume.

History 
Pinecrest High School opened in 1969. Located just west of Southern Pines, Pinecrest represents the consolidation of seven high schools in southern Moore County and the merger of three administrative school units.

On September 3, 1969, the Pinecrest student body of about 1,600 first gathered. Their day was not divided into the traditional six-period day. Instead, their computer schedules reflected the flexibility of twenty-one blocks of time called mods. They heard terms like team teaching, teacher assistants, media center, closed-circuit television instruction, and programmed instruction.

Pinecrest's physical plant was tailored for flexible scheduling, large and small group instruction, and independent study. The large, open classrooms could accommodate four small classes at a time or one large group of as many as two hundred students. Traditional study halls were replaced with learning labs. In each building a vending area that provided hot and cold foods replaced the traditional school cafeteria.

The Pinecrest curriculum offered 83 courses the first year as well as extra programs for both remediation and enrichment. Pinecrest offered a full range of traditional high school sports. The athletic program was headquartered on campus, but many athletic events utilized the facilities at the feeder schools. The band program was organized before the school was opened. The Marching Band began the first year with twenty-five members. The choral organized the following year.

When the school opened, its physical plant consisted of 3 two-story classroom buildings. In the spring of 1974, the music program moved into the newly completed music building. The cafeteria, also located in that building, began serving "a la carte" and regular type A school lunches. In the fall of 1974, Pinecrest played its first homecoming game on its own athletic field. An ultra-modern gymnasium was opened in 1975.

The school finished construction on February 15, 1976. At that time, six and one-half years after it opened, the major facilities were completed. In addition to the classroom building, a music building, a cafeteria, a gymnasium and a football field, the plant included a baseball field, tennis courts, a student  common building, and paved parking areas.

The school day was changed to a more traditional six-period day, and other changes soon followed as the school slowly returned to the traditional structure. Classes returned to a traditional size with larger instruction being offered as the need arose. Programs of instruction were greatly expanded with additions in the vocational and business departments. In the area of remediation, the program for the educable mentally handicapped was improved while programs for the multi-handicapped, educable/trainable, learning disabled, behaviorally and emotionally handicapped, visually and physically impaired were added. Title I Reading was added in 1978 and a Competency Remediation Lab followed passage of the North Carolina Competency requirement. Opportunities for the academically talented were also improved. Students were able to begin their college-bound English as freshmen. Since 1974, seniors have been able to take Advanced Placement English. The Mathematics Department offered the traditional courses in algebra and geometry as well as two courses in advanced math, and in 1973, it added Advanced Placement Calculus. In 1980, the Science Department expanded its college preparatory courses from five to six when it included Advanced Placement Biology. In 1981, the Social Studies Department expanded its program to include Advanced Placement American History. Through the Foreign Language Departments, students were given the opportunity to take four years of French or Spanish. German was added to the curriculum in 1980.

In 1982, the school received a new administration whose emphasis centered on returning the school to a more traditional operating mode while retaining the unique aspects that had been successful. Increased attention was given to student pride, parental involvement, participation in extracurricular activities, community awareness, and continued academic excellence. Results were immediate and tangible. Soccer and swimming have been added to the athletic program while a new softball field and a practice field have been constructed. Currently, plans are to build a modern football field stadium. In the academic area, the school has been recognized twice as a North Carolina School of Excellence. An extensive curriculum review has been conducted and courses in data processing, computerized math, computer science, and computerized accounting have been added. In local competition such as Quiz Bowl, Morehead nominations, and vocational contests, Pinecrest students have won more than 80% of the awards. Community support has continued to grow, as evidenced by the passage of the 1986 School Bond Referendum which provides a $2,500,000 for construction of a new auditorium as well as other money for facility improvement.

Pinecrest has been a part of quite a few curriculum and building changes and additions. Included in these are the following:

 The Tech Prep program, which began in 1988.
 The SIMS Program, which began in 1988–89.
 A computer lab in the Media Center, which began in 1990.
 A Teen Life Center and program, which began in 1990.
 The Peer Helpers group, which was organized in 1991–92.
 An awards system (Vision Program), which was initiated in 1991–92.
 The School-Within-a-School program, which was started in August 1992.
 Honors/AP courses, which are now in all the academic areas of the curriculum.
 IB Program 1998–2010

Orchestra

Honors Theatre Ensemble 
Each fall the honors theatre ensemble (known as the Pinecrest Players) competes in regional theatre competition. During the 2009–2010 school year the group presented a play entitled "At the Bottom of Lake Missoula" by Ed Monk and received the top honors at the regional competition. The show moved on to compete at the North Carolina Theatre Conference's High School Play Festival where it again took home the top prize and moved on to compete in the South Eastern Theatre Conference in Lexington, Kentucky. This is the first time in the school's history that the theatre program has advance to the highest level of competition.
In the 2013–2014 school year, the ensemble presented the Alice and Wonderland sequel titled "Through the Looking Glass". After being awarded the Distinguished Play Award at the regional festival, making it one of only 16 productions (out of the original 128 statewide) to receive the invitation to the NCTC State Play Festival in Greensboro.

Band
Pinecrest High School has a marching band, symphonic band, various music ensembles.

Vandalism
In 2010, the letters "P", "E", and "R" were removed from the sign at Building 1 above the front entrance in a 'senior prank', which caused the sign to read "Incest High School". This move was criticized by school staff, who said it had gone "too far", citing a $100 dollar cost each to replace the three letters. Three students later confessed after an investigation and were charged with vandalism.

Buildings 
Pinecrest is composed of nine different buildings.  Pinecrest's buildings 1–3 are the original buildings that were built in 1969. Building 4 is a more recent building that connects with the cafeteria and gym.  Building 9, also referred to as the Freshman Academy (even though more than just freshman students use the building) is the newest building that was completed before the second semester of the 2006–07 school year. Pinecrest has a Gymnasium along with a Field House that houses the Home and Visitors locker rooms for its athletic teams. The Butler building houses a room for PC's Exceptional Education program. The R. E. Lee Auditorium is located on the west side of the school and houses the Band, Theatre, Orchestra, and Chorus.

Architecture 
Pinecrest High School has an outdoor/indoor design, with students having to traverse between outdoor classes, and some classrooms that are inside of hallways. Most buildings are two floors, except the 9th Grade Building, and the learning cottages. The courtyard is in the center of the school, and is where most students eat their lunch. Most of the buildings have direct access to the courtyard, excluding the gym, weight room, auditorium, the 9th grade building, and the learning cottages. Also, there are benches and picnic tables  set up in the courtyard allowing students the ability to sit and enjoy their lunch.

During the 2008–2009 school years, Pinecrest's aging outdoor wooden tables and benches were replaced with more durable plastic coated metal tables and benches.

The Patriot 
The Patriot, Pinecrest's school paper, was published from founding of the school in 1969 to 2016.

Annual events

Spirit Week (Homecoming) 

Spirit week starts on the week of the homecoming game. During this week, students may participate in daily events (such as Wacky Tacky Day and Blast from the Past). Also, during Spirit Week, PCHS as well as multiple clubs (Cheerleading, Key Club, etc.) host their own events during Oktoberfest. Oktoberfest generally occurs one day before the homecoming game and two days prior to the homecoming dance.

In 2007, the PCHS athletic department decided to add another event (a parade) to the lineup of others. The Homecoming Parade (as it is called) allows the athletes of the Football and Men's Soccer teams, Cheerleading, Marching Band and Drumline, as well as a handful of various floats designed for the event follow a circuit taking them around downtown Southern Pines. There is generally a good turnout of observers ranging from other students, parents, friends, local business owners, as well as fans of PCHS.

In 2009, PCHS moved Oktoberfest to its original month, October.

Clubs 

The Pinecrest High School Step Team is also known as Omega Psi Rho.

Pinecrest also has clubs such as M.A.C. (modern arts club), International Thespian Society, Earth club, Art club, Speech and Debate team, Key club, Leo club, Polis Philosophy Club, Pinecrest Young Republicans, Pinecrest Liberty Foundation, Interact Club, Take Back, Drill team, Orienteering, Spanish and French clubs, FCCLA, SEA, Global Awareness, Ultimate Frisbee, Robotics team, and more.

Athletics 
Pinecrest High school is a North Carolina High School Athletic Association (NCHSAA) 4-A high school.

The John Williams Athletic Complex (A former athletic director and football coach at Pinecrest), which includes a lighted 4500 seat football/soccer stadium and an eight lane track. (A planned renovation for the summer of 2010 is the resurfacing of the field with artificial turf.)

The John Williams Baseball Field which is lighted and seats 500. (The new stadium has been completed.  Future additions include an enclosed press box, a snack bar, and a new storage building).

The James Moore Gymnasium is the home for basketball, volleyball and wrestling and seats 1400.

The remainder of the athletic facilities includes a lighted softball field, which seats 250; a practice football field, a practice soccer field, a lighted ROTC practice area (turned into parking lot before the 2007–08 school year), and six hard court tennis courts. There are also many trails that run through the woods behind the school. These trails are used by the cross country and track teams.

Teams 
 Chess
 Baseball
 Men's & Women's Basketball
 Men's and Women's Cross Country
 Wrestling
 Men's and Women's Golf
 Men's and Women's Soccer
 Swimming
 Softball
 Men's and Women's Tennis
 Men's and Women's Track
 Volleyball
 Football
Men's and Women's Lacrosse
Cheerleading
Ultimate Frisbee (club sport)

Baseball

The Pinecrest Men's Baseball team won the 4A state championship in 1979.

Cross Country

The Pinecrest Men's Cross Country team won the 4A state championship in 2004 and was runner-up to Chapel Hill High School by 1pt in 2005.

Track and Field

The Pinecrest  Women's team won the 1979 state championship and the Men's team tied for the state championship in 1998.

Wrestling

In 2012, the Pinecrest Wrestling team won the NC 4A state tournament championship, beating out Parkland High School who had won five straight championships for the title.

Men's Golf 
In 2008, the PCHS Men's Golf team won the 4A State Championship. Coming from a nine stroke deficit after the first round, the Patriots rallied to win by six. They defeated first round leader Providence as well as two time defending state champions Green Hope. This was the first ever state championship for the Men's Golf team.

Football 
In 2008, for the first time in over 16 years, the football team defeated Richmond County High School. That game was Richmond's homecoming game. Pinecrest finished that season 7–4 after winning only 8 games over the previous 6 years.

In 2009, the Patriots carried a 9–2 record into the playoffs.  They defeated their first opponent CE Jordan (6-5), 28–0.  During their second, and final game during the 2009 playoffs, the Patriots went up against Fuquay Varina (10–2) and lost, 41–7.  They finished their season 10–3.  During this season, Pinecrest set many school firsts.  Among them were; first 9 win season and hosting not 1, but 2, home playoff games.

In 2010, the Patriots were unable to play in playoffs due to being put on probation for on field fighting with rival Union Pines.

Team divisions 
Most of Pinecrest's sports teams have a Junior Varsity (JV) and Varsity teams. Football, Basketball, and Baseball are the only teams that have a freshman team, along with both JV and Varsity teams.

Notable alumni
James Baldwin, former MLB pitcher and All-Star selection in 2000
James L. Boles Jr., member of the North Carolina House of Representatives
Jeff Capel II, college basketball head coach and NBA assistant coach
Bobby Collins, college basketball head coach
Henry Douglas, former American football wide receiver
Charlie Engle, ultramarathon runner and author
Seth Maness, former MLB pitcher for the Saint Louis Cardinals and Kansas City Royals
Dillon Maples, MLB pitcher for the Chicago Cubs
Steve Marshall, Attorney General of Alabama
Richard T. Morgan, former member of the North Carolina General Assembly

References 

Public high schools in North Carolina
Schools in Moore County, North Carolina